Philadelphia has a total parklandincluding city parks, squares, playgrounds, athletic fields, recreation centers and golf courses, plus state and federal parksthat amounts to . The Fairmount Park system historically encompassed 63 park areas prior to 2010, including six city-owned public golf courses, along with the landscaped areas of the Benjamin Franklin Parkway, the Roosevelt Boulevard and the Southern Boulevard Parkway, two farms and the Manayunk Canal. Those 63 historic park areas have been included among 378 separate facilities which in turn contain the 7 large watershed parks (Fairmount and FDR Parks, plus the Wissahickon, Pennypack, Cobbs, Tacony and Poquessing Creek parks), 143 neighborhood parks and squares, 156 recreation centers and playgrounds, various playing fields, courts, rinks and swimming pools, 40 community gardens and orchards, as well as the six aforementioned golf courses. All facilities are administered by the Philadelphia Parks & Recreation department since a merger of the Fairmount Park Commission and the Department of Recreation in 2010. The new Parks & Recreation department also administers six older adult centers, three environmental education centers, 40 historic sites and 25 KEYSPOT computer labs.

In terms of total park area to population, Philadelphia is ranked ninth among the most densely populated cities in the United States with 7.2 park acres per 1000 residents, and fourth among the same cities in total acres of parkland, behind New York City, Los Angeles and Chicago. Philadelphia has reserved 13.5% of its city acreage for parkland, which is the eighth highest percentage among the most densely populated cities.

List of parks

  

 Approximate acres based on OpenStreetMap estimates
 Philadelphia acres onlymajority of the wildlife refuge is located in Delaware County

Gallery

References

External links

Philadelphia's Nature, Parks and Gardens, at VisitPhilly.com
History of Philadelphia's public parks, at The Encyclopedia of Greater Philadelphia

 
parks
Philadelphia